The Allegory of Peace, Art and Abundance is a painting of 1602 by the German artist Hans von Aachen. It emerged from the artistic school that developed in the court of the Holy Roman Emperor Rudolf II. The three female figures are personifications of Peace (with an olive branch), Science and the Liberal Arts (with a sphere and a palette), and Abundance (with a goblet and a cornucopia), all of which are implied to have flourished under the emperor's policies. The work entered the Hermitage's collection in 1925, coming from the Gatchina Palace.

References

1600s paintings
German paintings
Paintings in the collection of the Hermitage Museum